Nicholas Stephen Millington (born August 9, 1991) is a retired professional footballer. Born in the United States, he played for the Guyana national team.

Career

Youth, College and Amateur
After spending time with Raleigh CASL Elite and the U.S. Soccer Residency program, Millington signed to play at Wake Forest University.  In this freshman year in 2008, Millington made 13 appearances including one starts and finished the year with a goal and an assist.  

After making 14 appearances for Wake Forest in 2009, Millington transferred to Elon University where he saw more playing time, starting 16 of 17 matches in 2010 and scoring one goal.  In 2011, he made 21 appearances and finished with a goal and two assists.

Millington also spent the 2009 season with the Cary Clarets in the USL Premier Development League.

Professional
On May 18, 2012, Millington signed his first professional contract, joining NASL club Carolina RailHawks.  He made his professional debut on June 2 in a 2-1 win over the Puerto Rico Islanders.

International
Millington spent time with both the U.S. U17 and U18 national teams.  On August 13, 2012, Millington was called up by the Guyanese national team for their international friendly match against Bolivia.

References

External links
 
 Elon University bio
 U.S. Soccer profile

1991 births
Living people
Guyanese footballers
Guyana international footballers
American soccer players
United States men's youth international soccer players
American sportspeople of Guyanese descent
Wake Forest Demon Deacons men's soccer players
Elon Phoenix men's soccer players
Cary Clarets players
North Carolina FC players
USL League Two players
North American Soccer League players
Association football midfielders
Association football defenders